Robert Deitch is an American author and social activist.   He works out of Los Angeles, California.

Works
 Hemp - American History Revisited:  The Plant with a Divided History, Algora Publishing, 2003, 
 The Modern Architectural Dictionary & Quick Reference Guide for Architects, Interior Designers and The Construction Trade. Rhinoceros/West Press, 1999,

See also
 Decorticator

References 

American male writers
American social activists
Living people
Year of birth missing (living people)